Michelsberg (Kelheim) is a hill in the town of Kelheim, Bavaria, Germany.

Mountains of Bavaria
Kelheim (district)